Al Hudaydah is a governorate of Yemen. Its capital is Al Hudaydah. The governorate is also sometimes referred to as the Western Coast. With an estimated population of nearly 4 million, it is the third-most populous governorate in Yemen, after Taiz and Ibb.

Al Hudaydah Governorate borders the Red Sea and is part of the narrow Tihamah region. Its capital, Al Hudaydah, also serves as an important local port city.

Geography

Adjacent governorates

 Hajjah Governorate (north)
 Al Mahwit Governorate (east)
 Sanaa Governorate (east)
 Raymah Governorate (east)
 Dhamar Governorate (east)
 Ibb Governorate (east)
 Taiz Governorate (south)

Districts
Al Hudaydah Governorate is divided into the following 26 districts. These districts are further divided into sub-districts, and then further subdivided into villages:

 Ad Dahi District
 Ad Durayhimi District
 Al Garrahi District
 Al Hajjaylah District
 Al Hali District
 Al Hawak District
 Al Khawkhah District
 Al Mansuriyah District
 Al Marawi'ah District
 Al Mighlaf District
 Al Mina District
 Al Munirah District
 Al Qanawis District
 Alluheyah District
 As Salif District
 As Sukhnah District
 At Tuhayat District
 Az Zaydiyah District
 Az Zuhrah District
 Bajil District
 Bayt al-Faqih District
 Bura District
 Hays District
 Jabal Ra's District
 Kamaran District 
 Zabid District

References

 
Governorates of Yemen